Bellusaurus (meaning "Beautiful lizard", from Vulgar Latin bellus 'beautiful' (masculine form) and Ancient Greek sauros 'lizard') was a small short-necked sauropod dinosaur from the  Middle Jurassic which measured about  long. Its fossils were found in Shishugou Formation rocks in the northeastern Junggar Basin in China.

Discovery and naming

The type and only known species is Bellusaurus sui, formally described by Dong Zhiming in 1991. The remains of Bellusaurus were found in the Shishugou Formation in the northeastern Junggar Basin in China. Seventeen individuals were found in a single quarry, suggesting that a herd had been killed in a flash flood. Some features suggest they may have all been juveniles. Bellusaurus sui was derived from the Latin bellus meaning small, delicate, and beautiful, as these sauropods were small and lightly built. The specific name, sui, was named in honor of Senior Preparator Youling Sui, a notable restorer of dinosaurs remains. Bellusaurus was the last restoration undertaken by Mr. Sui.

Description

It is unknown if the material representing Bellusaurus is from juvenile specimens. Juvenile characteristics of dinosaurs have been noted by Galton in 1982 of stegosaur growth, whose study would suggest that the group of small Bellusaurus sauropods were juveniles that were subjected to a single catastrophe resulting in the mass death assemblage seen from this discovery. Because of the uncertainty of the specimens age, it could be difficult to place the species into a specific taxonomic assignment due to having unstable morphological characteristics.

References

External links
 Bellusaurus in the Dino Directory

Macronarians
Middle Jurassic dinosaurs of Asia
Jurassic China
Fossils of China
Paleontology in Xinjiang
Fossil taxa described in 1990
Taxa named by Dong Zhiming